José Passera (21 February 1915 – 23 April 1990) was an Argentine sports shooter. He competed in the trap event during the 1964 Summer Olympics.

References

External links
 

1915 births
1990 deaths
Argentine male sport shooters
Olympic shooters of Argentina
Shooters at the 1964 Summer Olympics
Place of birth missing